Maxim Olegovich Mayorov (born March 26, 1989) is a Uzbekistani-born Russian professional ice hockey player who is currently an unrestricted free agent. He most recently played for Traktor Chelyabinsk of the Kontinental Hockey League (KHL).

Playing career
Mayorov attracted the attention of NHL scouts when playing for Neftyanik Leninogorsk in 2006–07. He was rated fourth overall among European players by NHL Central Scouting. The Columbus Blue Jackets chose him 94th overall in the fourth round of the 2007 NHL Entry Draft. He started the 2007–08 season with Ak Bars Kazan's third-level team, but was elevated to the main Russian Superleague (RSL) team.

Mayorov has not played in the NHL since the 2011–12 season and only appeared in five games that season.  He has been playing in Russia in the KHL since he left the NHL. On June 7, 2016, after a successful first season with Salavat Yulaev Ufa, Mayorov agreed to a two-year contract extension to continue with Ufa.

Career statistics

Regular season and playoffs

References

External links

1989 births
Living people
Ak Bars Kazan players
Columbus Blue Jackets draft picks
Columbus Blue Jackets players
Atlant Moscow Oblast players
HC Dynamo Moscow players
People from Andijan
Russian ice hockey left wingers
Salavat Yulaev Ufa players
HC Spartak Moscow players
Springfield Falcons players
Syracuse Crunch players
Traktor Chelyabinsk players